Igor Fyodorovich Stravinsky (6 April 1971) was a Russian composer, pianist and conductor, later of French (from 1934) and American (from 1945) citizenship. He is widely considered one of the most important and influential composers of the 20th century and a pivotal figure in modernist music due to his unique approach to rhythm, orchestration, and tonality.

Stravinsky met Russian composer Nikolai Rimsky-Korsakov in 1902 and studied under him until 1908. At the premiere of his Scherzo fantastique and Feu d'artifice in February 1909 was Russian impresario Sergei Diaghilev, who had just formed the Ballets Russes ballet company. Diaghilev commissioned Stravinsky to write three ballets throughout the 1910s: The Firebird (1910), Petrushka (1911), and The Rite of Spring (1913), the last of which brought him international fame after the near-riot at the premiere.

Stravinsky's compositions were diverse. The Rite of Spring changed how composers understood rhythmic structure. His "Russian period", which continued with works such as Renard, L'Histoire du soldat, and Les noces, was followed in the 1920s by a period in which he turned to neoclassicism. His work from the Russian period made use of classical musical styles (concerto grosso, fugue, and symphony) and drew from earlier styles, especially those of the 18th century. In the 1950s, Stravinsky adopted serial procedures. His compositions of this period shared traits with examples of his earlier output: rhythmic energy, the construction of extended melodic ideas out of a few two- or three-note cells, and clarity of form and instrumentation.

Biography

Early life, 1882–1901
His father, Fyodor Ignatievich Stravinsky, was an established bass opera singer in the Kiev Opera and the Mariinsky Theatre in Saint Petersburg and his mother, Anna Kirillovna Stravinskaya (née Kholodovskaya; 1854–1939), a native of Kiev, was one of four daughters of a high-ranking official in the Kiev Ministry of Estates. Igor was the third of their four sons; his brothers were Roman, Yury, and Gury. The Stravinsky family was of Polish and Russian heritage, descended "from a long line of Polish grandees, senators and landowners". It is traceable to the 17th and 18th centuries to the bearers of the Sulima and Strawiński coat of arms. The original family surname was Sulima-Strawiński; the name "Stravinsky" originated from the word "Strava", one of the variants of the Streva river in Lithuania.

On 10 August 1882, Stravinsky was baptised at Nikolsky Cathedral in Saint Petersburg. Until 1914, he spent most of his summers in the town of Ustilug, now in Ukraine, where his father-in-law owned an estate. Stravinsky's first school was The Second Saint Petersburg Gymnasium, where he stayed until his mid-teens. Then, he moved to Gourevitch Gymnasium, a private school, where he studied history, mathematics, and languages (Latin, Greek, and Slavonic; and French, German, and his native Russian). Stravinsky expressed his general distaste for schooling and recalled being a lonely pupil: "I never came across anyone who had any real attraction for me."

Stravinsky took to music at an early age and began regular piano lessons at age nine, followed by tuition in music theory and composition. At around eight years old, he attended a performance of Tchaikovsky's ballet The Sleeping Beauty at the Mariinsky Theatre, which began a lifelong interest in ballets and the composer himself. By age fourteen, Stravinsky had mastered Mendelssohn's Piano Concerto No. 1, and at age fifteen finished a piano reduction of a string quartet by Alexander Glazunov, who reportedly considered Stravinsky unmusical and thought little of his skills.

Education and first compositions, 1901–1909
Despite Stravinsky's enthusiasm and ability in music, his parents expected him to study law, and he at first took to the subject. In 1901, he enrolled at the University of Saint Petersburg, studying criminal law and legal philosophy, but attendance at lectures was optional and he estimated that he turned up to fewer than fifty classes in his four years of study.

In 1902, Stravinsky met Vladimir, a fellow student at the University of Saint Petersburg and the youngest son of Nikolai Rimsky-Korsakov. Rimsky-Korsakov at that time was arguably the leading Russian composer, and he was a professor at Saint Petersburg Conservatory. Stravinsky wished to meet Vladimir's father to discuss his musical aspirations. He spent the summer of 1902 with Rimsky-Korsakov and his family in Heidelberg, Germany. Rimsky-Korsakov suggested to Stravinsky that he should not enter the Saint Petersburg Conservatory but continue private lessons in theory.

By the time of his father's death in 1902, Stravinsky was spending more time studying music than law. His decision to pursue music full time was helped when the university was closed for two months in 1905 in the aftermath of Bloody Sunday, which prevented him from taking his final law exams. In April 1906, Stravinsky received a half-course diploma and concentrated on music thereafter. In 1905, he began studying with Rimsky-Korsakov twice a week and came to regard him as a second father. These lessons continued until Rimsky-Korsakov's death in 1908. Stravinsky completed his first composition during this time, the Symphony in E-flat, catalogued as Opus 1. In the wake of Rimsky-Korsakov's death, Stravinsky composed Funeral Song, Op. 5, which was performed once and then considered lost until its re-discovery in 2015.

In August 1905, Stravinsky became engaged to his first cousin, Katherina Gavrylovna Nosenko. In spite of the Orthodox Church's opposition to marriage between first cousins, the couple married on 23 January 1906. They lived in the family's residence at 6 Kryukov Canal in Saint Petersburg before they moved into a new home in Ustilug, which Stravinsky designed and built, and which he later called his "heavenly place". He wrote many of his first compositions there. It is now a museum with documents, letters, and photographs on display, and an annual Stravinsky Festival takes place in the nearby town of Lutsk. Stravinsky and Nosenko's first two children, Fyodor (Theodore) and Ludmila, were born in 1907 and 1908, respectively.

Ballets for Diaghilev and international fame, 1909–1920

By 1909, Stravinsky had composed two more pieces, Scherzo fantastique, Op. 3, and Feu d'artifice (Fireworks), Op. 4. In February of that year, both were performed in Saint Petersburg at a concert that marked a turning point in Stravinsky's career. In the audience was Sergei Diaghilev, a Russian impresario and owner of the Ballets Russes who was struck with Stravinsky's compositions. He commissioned Stravinsky to orchestrate Chopin's Nocturne in A-flat major and Grande valse brillante in E-flat major for the new ballet Les Sylphides as part of the 1909 ballet season, which were finished by April of that year. While planning for the 1910 ballet season, Diaghilev wished to stage a mix of Russian opera and ballet for the 1910 season in Paris, among them a new ballet from fresh talent that was based on the Russian fairytale of the Firebird. After Anatoly Lyadov was given the task of composing the score, he informed Diaghilev that he needed about one year to complete it. Diaghilev then asked the 28-year-old Stravinsky, who had provided satisfactory orchestrations for him for the previous season at short notice and agreed to compose a full score. At about 50 minutes in length, The Firebird was revised by Stravinsky into concert suites in 1919 and 1945.

The Firebird premiered at the Opera de Paris on 25 June 1910 to widespread critical acclaim and Stravinsky became an overnight sensation. As his wife was expecting their third child, the Stravinskys spent the summer in La Baule in western France. In September, they moved to Clarens, Switzerland, where their second son, Sviatoslav (Soulima), was born. The family would spend their summers in Russia and winters in Switzerland until 1914. Diaghilev commissioned Stravinsky to score a second ballet for the 1911 Paris season. The result was Petrushka, based the Russian folk tale featuring the titular character, a puppet, who falls in love with another, a ballerina. Though it failed to capture the immediate reception that The Firebird had following its premiere at Théâtre du Châtelet in June 1911, the production continued Stravinsky's success.

It was Stravinsky's third ballet for Diaghilev, The Rite of Spring, that caused a sensation among critics, fellow composers, and concertgoers. Based on an  idea thought up by Stravinsky while composing Firebird, the production features a series of primitive pagan rituals celebrating the advent of spring, after which a young girl is chosen as a sacrificial victim and dances herself to death. Stravinsky's score contained many novel features for its time, including experiments in tonality, metre, rhythm, stress and dissonance. The radical nature of the music and choreography caused a near-riot at its premiere at the Théâtre des Champs-Élysées on 29 May 1913.

Shortly after the premiere, Stravinsky contracted typhoid from eating bad oysters and he was confined to a Paris nursing home. He left in July 1913 and returned to Ustilug. For the rest of the summer he focused on his first opera, The Nightingale (Le Rossignol), based on the same-titled story by Hans Christian Andersen, which he had started in 1908. On 15 January 1914, Stravinsky and Nosenko had their fourth child, Marie Milène (or Maria Milena). After her delivery, Nosenko was discovered to have tuberculosis and was confined to a sanatorium in Leysin in the Alps. Stravinsky took up residence nearby, where he completed The Nightingale. The work premiered in Paris in May 1914, after the Moscow Free Theatre had commissioned the piece for 10,000 roubles but soon became bankrupt. Diaghilev agreed for the Ballets Russes to stage it. The opera had only lukewarm success with the public and the critics, apparently because its delicacy did not meet their expectations following the tumultuous Rite of Spring. However, composers including Ravel, Bartók, and Reynaldo Hahn found much to admire in the score's craftsmanship, even alleging to detect the influence of Arnold Schoenberg.

In April 1914, Stravinsky and his family returned to Clarens. Following the outbreak of World War I later that year, he was ineligible for military service due to health reasons. Stravinsky managed a short visit to Ustilug to retrieve personal items just before national borders were closed. In June 1915, he and his family moved from Clarens to Morges, a town six miles from Lausanne on the shore of Lake Geneva. The family lived there (at three different addresses), until 1920. In December 1915, Stravinsky made his conducting debut at two concerts in aid of the Red Cross with The Firebird. The war and subsequent Russian Revolution in 1917 made it impossible for Stravinsky to return to his homeland.

Stravinsky began to struggle financially in the late 1910s as Russia (and its successor, the USSR) did not adhere to the Berne Convention, thus creating problems for Stravinsky to collect royalties for the performances of his pieces for the Ballets Russes. While composing his theatrical piece L'Histoire du soldat (The Soldier's Tale), Stravinsky approached Swiss philanthropist Werner Reinhart for financial assistance, who agreed to sponsor him and largely underwrite its first performance which took place in Lausanne in September 1918. In gratitude, Stravinsky dedicated the work to Reinhart and gave him the original manuscript. Reinhart supported Stravinsky further when he funded a series of concerts of his chamber music in 1919. In gratitude to his benefactor, Stravinsky also dedicated his Three Pieces for Solo Clarinet to Reinhart, who was also an amateur clarinetist.

Following the premiere of Pulcinella by the Ballets Russes in Paris on 15 May 1920, Stravinsky returned to Switzerland.

Life in France, 1920–1939
In June 1920, Stravinsky and his family left Switzerland for France, first settling in Carantec for the summer while they sought a permanent home in Paris.

They soon heard from couturière Coco Chanel, who invited the family to live in her Paris mansion until they had found their own residence. The Stravinskys accepted and arrived in September. Chanel helped secure a guarantee for a revival production of The Rite of Spring by the Ballets Russes from December 1920 with an anonymous gift to Diaghilev that was claimed to be worth 300,000 francs.

In 1920, Stravinsky signed a contract with the French piano manufacturing company Pleyel. As part of the deal, Stravinsky transcribed most of his compositions for their player piano, the Pleyela. The company helped collect Stravinsky's mechanical royalties for his works and provided him with a monthly income. In 1921, he was given studio space at their Paris headquarters where he worked and entertained friends and acquaintances. The piano rolls were not recorded, but were instead marked up from a combination of manuscript fragments and handwritten notes by Jacques Larmanjat, musical director of Pleyel's roll department. During the 1920s, Stravinsky recorded Duo-Art piano rolls for the Aeolian Company in London and New York City, not all of which have survived.

Stravinsky met Vera de Bosset in Paris in February 1921, while she was married to the painter and stage designer Serge Sudeikin, and they began an affair that led to de Bosset leaving her husband.

In May 1921, Stravinsky and his family moved to Anglet, a town close to the Spanish border. Their stay was short-lived as by autumn, they had settled to nearby Biarritz and Stravinsky completed his Trois mouvements de Petrouchka, a piano transcription of excerpts from Petrushka for Artur Rubinstein. Diaghilev then requested orchestrations for a revival production of Tchaikovsky's ballet The Sleeping Beauty. From then until his wife's death in 1939, Stravinsky led a double life, dividing his time between his family in Anglet, and Vera in Paris and on tour. Katherina reportedly bore her husband's infidelity "with a mixture of magnanimity, bitterness, and compassion".

In June 1923, Stravinsky's ballet Les noces (The Wedding) premiered in Paris and performed by the Ballets Russes. In the following month, he started to receive money from an anonymous patron from the US who insisted to remain anonymous and only identified themselves as "Madame". They promised to send him $6,000 in the course of three years, and sent Stravinsky an initial cheque for $1,000. Despite some payments not being sent, Robert Craft believed that the patron was famed conductor Leopold Stokowski, whom Stravinsky had recently met, and theorised that the conductor wanted to win Stravinsky over to visit the US.

In September 1924, Stravinsky bought a new home in Nice. Here, the composer re-evaluated his religious beliefs and reconnected with his Christian faith with help from a Russian priest, Father Nicholas. He also thought of his future, and used the experience of conducting the premiere of his Octet at one of Serge Koussevitzky's concerts the year before to build on his career as a conductor. Koussevitzky asked for Stravinsky to compose a new piece for one of his upcoming concerts; Stravinsky agreed to a piano concerto, to which Koussevitzky convinced him that he be the soloist at its premiere. Stravinsky agreed, and the Concerto for Piano and Wind Instruments was first performed in May 1924. The piece was a success, and Stravinsky secured himself the rights to exclusively perform the work for the next five years. Following a European tour through the latter half of 1924, Stravinsky completed his first US tour in early 1925, which spanned two months. It opened with Stravinsky conducting an all-Stravinsky program at Carnegie Hall. He visited Catalonia six times, and the first time, in 1924, after holding three concerts with the Pau Casals Orchestra at the Gran Teatre del Liceu, he stated: "Barcelona will be unforgettable for me. What I liked most was the cathedral and the sardanas".

In May 1927, Stravinsky's opera-oratorio Oedipus Rex premiered in Paris. The funding of its production was largely provided by Winnaretta Singer, Princesse Edmond de Polignac, who paid 12,000 francs for a private preview of the piece at her house. Stravinsky gave the money to Diaghilev to help finance the public performances. The premiere at the Théâtre Sarah-Bernhardt received a negative reaction, believed by painter Boris Grigoriev to be due to its tameness compared to The Firebird, which irked Stravinsky, who had started to become annoyed at the public's fixation towards his early ballets. In the summer of 1927 Stravinsky received a commission from Elizabeth Sprague Coolidge, his first from the US. A wealthy patroness of music, Coolidge requested a thirty-minute ballet score for a festival to be held at the Library of Congress, for a $1,000 fee. Stravinsky accepted and wrote Apollo, which premiered in 1928.

From 1931 to 1933, the Stravinskys lived in Voreppe, a commune near Grenoble in southeastern France. In June 1934, the couple acquired French citizenship. Later in that year, they left Voreppe to live on Rue du Faubourg Saint-Honoré in Paris, where they stayed for five years. The composer used his citizenship to publish his memoirs in French, entitled Chroniques de ma Vie in 1935, and underwent a US tour with Samuel Dushkin. His only composition of that year was the Concerto for Two Solo Pianos, which was written for himself and his son Soulima using a special double piano that Pleyel had built. The pair completed a tour of Europe and South America in 1936. In April 1937 in New York City he directed his three-part ballet Jeu de cartes, being a commission for Lincoln Kirstein's ballet company with choreography by George Balanchine. Upon his return to Europe, Stravinsky left Paris for Annemasse near the Swiss border to be near his family, after his wife and daughters Ludmila and Milena had contracted tuberculosis and were in a sanatorium. Ludmila died in late 1938, followed by his wife of 33 years, in March 1939. Stravinsky himself spent five months in hospital at Sancellemoz, during which time his mother also died.

During his later years in Paris, Stravinsky had developed professional relationships with key people in the United States: he was already working on his Symphony in C for the Chicago Symphony Orchestra and he had agreed to accept the Charles Eliot Norton Chair of Poetry of 1939–1940 at Harvard University and while there, deliver six lectures on music as part of the prestigious Charles Eliot Norton Lectures.

Life in the United States, 1939–1971

Early US years, 1939–1945

Stravinsky arrived in New York City on 30 September 1939 and headed for Cambridge, Massachusetts, to fulfill his engagements at Harvard. During his first two months in the US, Stravinsky stayed at Gerry's Landing, the home of art historian Edward W. Forbes. Vera arrived in January 1940 and the couple married on 9 March in Bedford, Massachusetts. After a period of travel, the two moved into a home in Beverly Hills, California, before they settled in Hollywood from 1941. Stravinsky felt the warmer Californian climate would benefit his health. Stravinsky had adapted to life in France, but moving to America at the age of 58 was a very different prospect. For a while, he maintained a circle of contacts and émigré friends from Russia, but he eventually found that this did not sustain his intellectual and professional life. He was drawn to the growing cultural life of Los Angeles, especially during World War II, when writers, musicians, composers, and conductors settled in the area. Music critic Bernard Holland claimed Stravinsky was especially fond of British writers, who visited him in Beverly Hills, "like W. H. Auden, Christopher Isherwood, Dylan Thomas. They shared the composer's taste for hard spirits – especially Aldous Huxley, with whom Stravinsky spoke in French." Stravinsky and Huxley had a tradition of Saturday lunches for west coast avant-garde and luminaries.

In 1940, Stravinsky completed his Symphony in C and conducted the Chicago Symphony Orchestra at its premiere later that year. It was at this time when Stravinsky began to associate himself with film music; the first major film to use his music was Walt Disney's animated feature Fantasia (1940) which includes parts of The Rite of Spring rearranged by Leopold Stokowski to a segment depicting the history of Earth and the age of dinosaurs. Orson Welles urged Stravinsky to write the score for Jane Eyre (1943), but negotiations broke down; a piece used in one of the film's hunting scenes was used in Stravinsky's orchestral work Ode (1943). An offer to score The Song of Bernadette (1943) also fell through; Stravinsky deemed the terms fell into the producer's favour. Music he had written for the film was later used in his Symphony in Three Movements.

Stravinsky's unconventional dominant seventh chord in his arrangement of the "Star-Spangled Banner" led to an incident with the Boston police on 15 January 1944, and he was warned that the authorities could impose a $100 fine upon any "re-arrangement of the national anthem in whole or in part". The police, as it turned out, were wrong. The law in question forbade using the national anthem "as dance music, as an exit march, or as a part of a medley of any kind", but the incident soon established itself as a myth, in which Stravinsky was supposedly arrested, held in custody for several nights, and photographed for police records.

On 28 December 1945, Stravinsky and his wife Vera became naturalized US citizens. Their sponsor and witness was actor Edward G. Robinson.

Last major works, 1945–1966

On the same day Stravinsky became an American citizen, he arranged for Boosey & Hawkes to publish rearrangements of several of his compositions and used his newly acquired American citizenship to secure a copyright on the material, thus allowing him to earn money from them. The five-year contract was finalised and signed in January 1947 which included a guarantee of $10,000 per for the first two years, then $12,000 for the remaining three.

In late 1945, Stravinsky received a commission from Europe, his first since Perséphone, in the form of a string piece for the 20th anniversary for Paul Sacher's Basle Chamber Orchestra. The Concerto in D premiered in 1947. In January 1946, Stravinsky conducted the premiere of his Symphony in Three Movements at Carnegie Hall in New York City. It marked his first premiere in the US. In 1947, Stravinsky was inspired to write his English-language opera The Rake's Progress by a visit to a Chicago exhibition of the same-titled series of paintings by the eighteenth-century British artist William Hogarth, which tells the story of a fashionable wastrel descending into ruin. W.H. Auden and writer Chester Kallman worked on the libretto. The opera premiered in 1951 and marks the final work of Stravinsky's neoclassical period. While composing The Rake's Progress, Stravinsky befriended Robert Craft, who became his personal assistant and close friend and encouraged the composer to write serial music. This began Stravinsky's third and final distinct musical period which lasted until his death.

In 1953, Stravinsky agreed to compose a new opera with a libretto by Dylan Thomas, which detailed the recreation of the world after one man and one woman remained on Earth after a nuclear disaster. Development on the project came to a sudden end following Thomas's death in November of that year. Stravinsky completed In Memoriam Dylan Thomas, a piece for tenor, string quartet, and four trombones, in 1954.

In 1961, Igor, Vera Stravinsky, and Robert Craft traveled to London, Zürich and Cairo on their way to Australia where Stravinsky and Craft conducted all-Stravinsky concerts in Sydney and Melbourne. They returned to California via New Zealand, Tahiti, and Mexico. In January 1962, during his tour's stop in Washington, D.C., Stravinsky attended a dinner at the White House with President John F. Kennedy in honour of his eightieth birthday, where he received a special medal for "the recognition his music has achieved throughout the world". In September 1962, Stravinsky returned to Russia for the first time since 1914, accepting an invitation from the Union of Soviet Composers to conduct six performances in Moscow and Leningrad. During the three-week visit he met with Soviet Premier Nikita Khrushchev and several leading Soviet composers, including Dmitri Shostakovich and Aram Khachaturian. Stravinsky did not return to his Hollywood home until December 1962 in what was almost eight months of continual travelling. Following the assassination of Kennedy in 1963, Stravinsky completed his Elegy for J.F.K. in the following year. The two-minute work took the composer two days to write.

By early 1964, the long periods of travel had started to affect Stravinsky's health. His case of polycythemia had worsened and his friends had noticed that his movements and speech had slowed. In 1965, Stravinsky agreed to have David Oppenheim produce a documentary film about himself for the CBS network. It involved a film crew following the composer at home and on tour that year, and he was paid $10,000 for the production. The documentary includes Stravinsky's visit to Les Tilleuls, the house in Clarens where he wrote the majority of The Rite of Spring. The crew asked Soviet authorities for permission to film Stravinsky returning to his hometown of Ustilug, but the request was denied. In 1966, Stravinsky completed his last major work, the Requiem Canticles.

Final years and death, 1967–1971
In February 1967, Stravinsky and Craft directed their own concert in Miami, Florida, the composer's first in that state. By this time, Stravinsky's typical performance fee had grown to $10,000. However subsequently, upon doctor's orders, offers to perform that required him to fly were generally declined. An exception to this was a concert at Massey Hall in Toronto in May 1967, where he conducted the relatively physically undemanding Pulcinella suite with the Toronto Symphony Orchestra. It was his final performance as conductor in his lifetime. While backstage at the venue, Stravinsky informed Craft that he believed he had suffered a stroke. In August 1967, Stravinsky was hospitalised in Hollywood for bleeding stomach ulcers and thrombosis which required a blood transfusion.

By 1968, Stravinsky had recovered enough to resume touring across the US with him in the audience while Craft took to the conductor's post for the majority of the concerts. In May 1968, Stravinsky completed the piano arrangement of two songs by Austrian composer Hugo Wolf for a small orchestra. In October, Stravinsky, Vera, and Craft travelled to Zürich to sort out business matters with Stravinsky's family. While there, Stravinsky's son Theodore held the manuscript of The Rite of Spring while Stravinsky signed it before giving it to Vera. The three considered relocating to Switzerland as they had become increasingly less fond of Hollywood, but they decided against it and returned to the US.

In October 1969, after close to three decades in California and being denied to travel overseas by his doctors due to ill health, Stravinsky and Vera secured a two-year lease for a luxury three bedroom apartment in Essex House in New York City. Craft moved in with them, effectively putting his career on hold to care for the ailing composer. Among Stravinsky's final projects was orchestrating two preludes from Bach's The Well-Tempered Clavier, but it was never completed. In June 1970, he travelled to Évian-les-Bains by Lake Geneva where he reunited with his eldest son Theodore and niece Xenia.

On 18 March 1971, Stravinsky was taken to Lenox Hill Hospital with pulmonary edema where he stayed for ten days. On 29 March, he moved into a newly furnished apartment at 920 Fifth Avenue, his first city apartment since living in Paris in 1939. After a period of well being, the edema returned on 4 April and Vera insisted that medical equipment should be installed in the apartment. Stravinsky soon stopped eating and drinking and died at 5:20 a.m. on 6 April at the age of 88. The cause on his death certificate is heart failure. A funeral service was held three days later at Frank E. Campbell Funeral Chapel. As per his wishes, he was buried in the Russian corner of the cemetery island of San Michele in Venice, several yards from the tomb of Sergei Diaghilev, having been brought there by gondola after a service at Santi Giovanni e Paolo led by Cherubin Malissianos, Archimandrite of the Greek Orthodox Church. During the service, his Requiem Canticles and organ music by Andrea Gabrieli were performed.

Music

Student works and early Russian period 

Only three works survive from before Stravinsky met Rimsky-Korsakov in August 1902: Tarantella (1898), Scherzo in G minor (1902), and The Storm Cloud, the former two being works for piano and the latter for voice and piano. Stravinsky's first assignment from Rimsky-Korsakov was the four-movement Piano Sonata in F minor, which was also his first work to be performed in public. Rimsky-Korsakov often gave Stravinsky the task of orchestrating various works, which Eric Walter White describes as an "excuse for the analysis of the works' form and structure." Additionally, a number of Stravinsky's student compositions were performed at Rimsky-Korsakov's gatherings at his home; these include a set of bagatelles, a "chanson comique", and a cantata, showing the use of classical musical techniques that would later define Stravinsky's neoclassical period. Stephen Walsh described this time in Stravinsky's musical career as "aesthetically cramped" due to the "dry, cynical conservatism" of Rimsky-Korsakov and his music.

Stravinsky's "Russian period" began during his time under Rimsky-Korsakov and was characterized by influence from Russian composers, folk tunes, and literature. Walsh notes the influence of Tchaikovsky and Mussorgsky in Stravinsky's first major orchestral work, the Symphony in E major (1907). Additionally, Rimsky-Korsakov thought the work was swayed too much by Glazunov's and his own styles. White writes that Rimsky-Korsakov was "highly suspicious of the one or two 'modernist' touches" in Faun and Shepherdess (1907), a three-song cycle based on poems by Pushkin.

Works for Diaghilev 
Stravinsky completed his Scherzo fantastique in March 1908 and Feu d'artifice around June, both of which were his last works under Rimsky-Korsakov. The premiere of these works attracted the attention of Diaghilev, who would commission The Firebird a few months later.

These works clearly reveal the influence of Rimsky-Korsakov, but as Richard Taruskin has shown, they also reveal Stravinsky's knowledge of music by Glazunov, Taneyev, Tchaikovsky, Wagner, Dvořák, and Debussy, among others.

The Firebird looked backward to Rimsky-Korsakov not only in its orchestration, but also in its overall structure, harmonic organization, and melodic content. According to Taruskin, Stravinsky's second ballet for the Ballets Russes, Petrushka, is where "Stravinsky at last became Stravinsky," referring to his "process of self discovery."  The Russian influence can be seen in the use of a number of Russian folk tunes in addition to two waltzes by Viennese composer Joseph Lanner and a French music hall tune (La Jambe en bois or The Wooden Leg).

Neoclassical period (–1954)
Apollon musagète (1928), Perséphone (1933), and Orpheus (1947) exemplify not only Stravinsky's return to the music of the Classical period but also his exploration of themes from the ancient Classical world, such as Greek mythology. The first movement of his Octet (1923) uses the sonata form, showing his return to older structural styles. Important works in this period include the Concerto for Piano and Wind Instruments (1924), the Serenade in A (1925), and Symphony of Psalms (1930).

Serial period (1954–1968)
In the 1950s, Stravinsky began using serial compositional techniques such as dodecaphony, the twelve-tone technique originally devised by Schoenberg. He first experimented with non-twelve-tone serial techniques in small-scale vocal and chamber works such as the Cantata (1952), the Septet (1953) and Three Songs from Shakespeare (1953). The first of his compositions fully based on such techniques was In Memoriam Dylan Thomas (1954). Agon (1954–57) was the first of his works to include a twelve-tone series and the second movement from Canticum Sacrum (1956) was the first piece to contain a movement entirely based on a tone row. Stravinsky expanded his use of dodecaphony in works such as Threni (1958) and A Sermon, a Narrative and a Prayer (1961), which are based on biblical texts, and The Flood (1962), which mixes brief biblical texts from the Book of Genesis with passages from the York and Chester Mystery Plays.

Personal life

Character
Stravinsky displayed a taste in literature that was wide and reflected his constant desire for new discoveries. The texts and literary sources for his work began with a period of interest in Russian folklore, which progressed to classical authors and the Latin liturgy and moved on to contemporary France (working with André Gide in Persephone) and eventually English literature, including Auden, T. S. Eliot, and medieval Latin verse.

He also had an inexhaustible desire to explore and learn about art, which manifested itself in several of his Paris collaborations. Not only was he the principal composer for Diaghilev's Ballets Russes, but he also collaborated with Pablo Picasso (Pulcinella, 1920), Jean Cocteau (Oedipus Rex, 1927), and George Balanchine (1928). His interest in art propelled him to develop a strong relationship with Picasso, whom he met in 1917, announcing that in "a whirlpool of artistic enthusiasm and excitement I at last met Picasso." From 1917 to 1920, the two engaged in an artistic dialogue in which they exchanged small-scale works of art to each other as a sign of intimacy, which included the famous portrait of Stravinsky by Picasso, and Stravinsky's "Sketch of Music for the Clarinet". This exchange was essential to establish how the artists would approach their collaborative space in Pulcinella.

The young Stravinsky was sympathetic to bourgeois liberalism and the aims of the Constitutional Democratic Party, even composing an anthem for the Russian Provisional Government, before shifting heavily towards the right following the October Revolution. In 1930, he remarked, "I don't believe that anyone venerates Mussolini more than I ... I know many exalted personages, and my artist's mind does not shrink from political and social issues. Well, after having seen so many events and so many more or less representative men, I have an overpowering urge to render homage to your Duce. He is the saviour of Italy and – let us hope – Europe." Later, after a private audience with Mussolini, he added, "Unless my ears deceive me, the voice of Rome is the voice of Il Duce. I told him that I felt like a fascist myself... In spite of being extremely busy, Mussolini did me the great honour of conversing with me for three-quarters of an hour. We talked about music, art and politics".

Upon relocating to America in the 1940s, Stravinsky again embraced the liberalism of his youth, remarking that Europeans "can have their generalissimos and Führers. Leave me Mr. Truman and I'm quite satisfied." Towards the end of his life, at Craft's behest, Stravinsky made a return visit to his native country and composed a cantata in Hebrew, travelling to Israel for its performance.

Stravinsky proved adept at playing the part of a 'man of the world', acquiring a keen instinct for business matters and appearing relaxed and comfortable in public. His successful career as a pianist and conductor took him to many of the world's major cities, including Paris, Venice, Berlin, London, Amsterdam, and New York City, and he was known for his polite, courteous, and helpful manner. Stravinsky was reputed to have been a philanderer and was rumoured to have had affairs with high-profile partners, such as Coco Chanel. He never referred to it himself, but Chanel spoke about the alleged affair at length to her biographer Paul Morand in 1946; the conversation was published thirty years later. The accuracy of Chanel's claims has been disputed by both Stravinsky's widow, Vera, and by Craft. Chanel's fashion house avers there is no evidence that any affair between Chanel and Stravinsky ever occurred. A fictionalization of the supposed affair formed the basis of the novel Coco and Igor (2002) and the film Coco Chanel & Igor Stravinsky (2009). Despite these alleged liaisons, Stravinsky was considered a family man and devoted to his children.

Religion

Stravinsky was a devout member of the Russian Orthodox Church during most of his life and believed that his musical talent was a gift from God, stating in an interview with Robert Craft that,I regard my talents as God-given, and I have always prayed to Him for strength to use them. When in early childhood I discovered that I had been made the custodian of musical aptitudes, I pledged myself to God to be worthy of their development...

As a child, he was brought up by his parents in the Russian Orthodox Church. Baptized at birth, he later rebelled against the Church and abandoned it by the time he was fourteen or fifteen years old. Throughout the rise of his career he was estranged from Christianity and it was not until he reached his early forties that he experienced a spiritual crisis. After befriending a Russian Orthodox priest, Father Nicholas, after his move to Nice in 1924, he reconnected with his faith. He rejoined the Russian Orthodox Church and afterwards remained a committed Christian. Robert Craft noted that Stravinsky prayed daily, before and after composing, and also prayed when facing difficulty. Towards the end of his life, he was no longer able to attend church services, though he affirmed that this was due to laziness rather than to a loss of faith. In his late seventies, Stravinsky said:I cannot now evaluate the events that, at the end of those thirty years, made me discover the necessity of religious belief. I was not reasoned into my disposition. Though I admire the structured thought of theology (Anselm's proof in the Fides Quaerens Intellectum, for instance) it is to religion no more than counterpoint exercises are to music. I do not believe in bridges of reason or, indeed, in any form of extrapolation in religious matters. ... I can say, however, that for some years before my actual "conversion", a mood of acceptance had been cultivated in me by a reading of the Gospels and by other religious literature.

Legacy

Influence
Culture magazine Life wrote in 1982 that Stravinsky was "the most important musical influence of the century." Erik Satie wrote in Vanity Fair that Stravinsky was "the master of an amazing dynamism ... the man ... is one of the greatest musicians who ever lived." Philip Glass wrote about his conducting in a 1998 TIME article: "He conducted with an energy and vividness that completely conveyed his every musical intention. Here was Stravinsky, a musical revolutionary whose own evolution never stopped. There is not a composer who lived during his time or is alive today who was not touched, and sometimes transformed, by his work."

Stravinsky's use of motivic development (the use of musical figures that are repeated in different guises throughout a composition or section of a composition) included additive motivic development. This is a technique in which notes are removed from or added to a motif without regard to the consequent changes in metre. A similar technique can be found as early as the 16th century, for example in the music of Cipriano de Rore, Orlandus Lassus, Carlo Gesualdo and Giovanni de Macque, music with which Stravinsky exhibited considerable familiarity.

The Rite of Spring (1913) is notable for its relentless use of ostinati, for example in the eighth-note ostinato on strings accented by eight horns in the section "Augurs of Spring (Dances of the Young Girls)". The work also contains passages where several ostinati clash against one another. Stravinsky was noted for his distinctive use of rhythm, especially in The Rite of Spring. According to the composer Philip Glass, "the idea of pushing the rhythms across the bar lines [...] led the way [...]. The rhythmic structure of music became much more fluid and in a certain way spontaneous." Glass also noted Stravinsky's "primitive, offbeat rhythmic drive". According to Andrew J. Browne, "Stravinsky is perhaps the only composer who has raised rhythm in itself to the dignity of art." Stravinsky's rhythm and vitality greatly influenced the composer Aaron Copland.

Over the course of his career, Stravinsky called for a wide variety of orchestral, instrumental, and vocal forces, ranging from single instruments in such works as Three Pieces for Solo Clarinet (1918) or Elegy for Solo Viola (1944) to the enormous orchestra of The Rite of Spring (1913), which Copland characterized as "the foremost orchestral achievement of the 20th century". Stravinsky’s creation of unique and idiosyncratic ensembles arising from the specific musical nature of individual works is a basic element of his style.

Included among his students in the 1940s was the American composer and music educator Robert Strassburg. In the early 1960s his students included Robert Craft and Warren Zevon.

Reception

There were reports of fistfights in the audience and the need for a police presence during the second act. The real extent of the tumult is open to debate and the reports may be apocryphal.

In 1998, Time magazine named Stravinsky one of the 100 most influential people of the century.  He was not only recognized for his composing, he also achieved fame as a pianist and as a conductor. In 1923, Erik Satie wrote an article about Igor Stravinsky in Vanity Fair. In the published article, Satie argued that measuring the "greatness" of an artist by comparing him to other artists, as if speaking about some "truth", is illusory and that every piece of music should be judged on its own merits and not by comparing it to the standards of other composers. Ironically, Jean Cocteau did exactly that when he commented deprecatingly on Stravinsky in his 1918 pamphlet  (most likely due to a grudge he held against Stravinsky).

According to The Musical Times in 1923:
All the signs indicate a strong reaction against the nightmare of noise and eccentricity that was one of the legacies of the war.... What (for example) has become of the works that made up the program of the Stravinsky concert which created such a stir a few years ago? Practically the whole lot are already on the shelf, and they will remain there until a few jaded neurotics once more feel a desire to eat ashes and fill their belly with the east wind.

In 1935, the American composer Marc Blitzstein compared Stravinsky to Jacopo Peri and C.P.E. Bach, conceding that, "there is no denying the greatness of Stravinsky. It is just that he is not great enough." Blitzstein's Marxist position was that Stravinsky's wish to "divorce music from other streams of life", which is "symptomatic of an escape from reality", resulted in a "loss of stamina", naming specifically Apollo, the Capriccio, and Le Baiser de la fée.

The composer Constant Lambert described pieces such as L'Histoire du soldat as containing "essentially cold-blooded abstraction". They are merely successions of notes that can conveniently be divided into groups of three, five, and seven and set against other mathematical groups" and he described the cadenza for solo drums as "musical purity ... achieved by a species of musical castration". He compared Stravinsky's choice of "the drabbest and least significant phrases" to Gertrude Stein's 'Everyday they were gay there, they were regularly gay there everyday', "whose effect would be equally appreciated by someone with no knowledge of English whatsoever".

In his 1949 book Philosophy of Modern Music, Theodor W. Adorno described Stravinsky as an acrobat and spoke of hebephrenic and psychotic traits in several of Stravinsky's works. Contrary to a common misconception, Adorno didn't believe the hebephrenic and psychotic imitations that the music was supposed to contain were its main fault, as he pointed out in a postscript that he added later to his book. Adorno's criticism of Stravinsky is more concerned with the "transition to positivity" Adorno found in his neoclassical works. According to Adorno, "one trick characterizes all of Stravinsky's formal endeavors: the effort of his music to portray time as in a circus tableau and to present time complexes as though they were spatial. This trick, however, soon exhausts itself." Adorno maintained that the "rhythmic procedures closely resemble the schema of catatonic conditions. In certain schizophrenics, the process by which the motor apparatus becomes independent leads to infinite repetition of gestures or words, following the decay of the ego."

Stravinsky's reputation in Russia and the USSR rose and fell. Performances of his music were banned from around 1933 until 1962, the year Khrushchev invited him to the USSR for an official state visit. In 1972, an official proclamation by the Soviet Minister of Culture, Yekaterina Furtseva, ordered Soviet musicians to "study and admire" Stravinsky's music and she made hostility toward it a potential offence.

While Stravinsky's music has been criticized for its range of styles, scholars had "gradually begun to perceive unifying elements in Stravinsky's music" by the 1980s. Earlier writers, such as Copland, Elliott Carter, and Boris de Schloezer held somewhat unfavorable views of Stravinsky's works, and Virgil Thomson, writing in the quarterly review Modern Music, could find only a common "'seriousness' of 'tone' or of 'purpose', 'the exact correlation between the goal and the means', or a dry 'ant-like neatness'".

Honours

Distinctions 
Stravinsky received the Royal Philharmonic Society's Gold Medal in 1954, the Léonie Sonning Music Prize in 1959, and the Wihuri Sibelius Prize in 1963. On 25 July 1966, Stravinsky was awarded the Portuguese Military Order of Saint James of the Sword. In 1977, the "Sacrificial Dance" from The Rite of Spring was included among many tracks around the world on the Voyager Golden Record. In 1982, Stravinsky was featured on a 2¢ postage stamp by the United States Postal Service as part of its Great Americans stamp series. Stravinsky has a star on the Hollywood Walk of Fame and was posthumously inducted into the National Museum of Dance and Hall of Fame in 2004.

As dedicatee 
Works dedicated to Stravinsky include:

 Chant funèbre by Utsyo Chakraborty
 En blanc et noir by Claude Debussy
 Revised version of La tragédie de Salomé by Florent Schmitt
 9 Pezzi by Alfredo Casella
 Piano Sonata No. 14 by Ethan Ngo
 Trois poèmes de Mallarmé by Maurice Ravel
 Quatre poèmes hindous Maurice Delage
 Saint-Pétersbourg by Louis Sauter
 Variations for Igor Stravinsky by Chakraborty

Grammy Awards 
Stravinsky received five Grammy Awards and eleven nominations. Three records of The Rite of Spring and Petrushka were inducted into the Grammy Hall of Fame in 1993, 1999, and 2000, and in 1987, he was posthumously awarded the Grammy Lifetime Achievement Award.

Recordings and publications

Igor Stravinsky found recordings a practical and useful tool in preserving his thoughts on the interpretation of his music. As a conductor of his own music, he recorded primarily for Columbia Records, beginning in 1928 with a performance of the original suite from The Firebird and concluding in 1967 with the 1945 suite from the same ballet. In the late 1940s he made several recordings for RCA Victor at the Republic Studios in Los Angeles. Although most of his recordings were made with studio musicians, he also worked with the Chicago Symphony Orchestra, the Cleveland Orchestra, the CBC Symphony Orchestra, the New York Philharmonic, the Royal Philharmonic Orchestra, and the Bavarian Radio Symphony Orchestra.

During his lifetime, Stravinsky appeared on several telecasts, including the 1962 world premiere of The Flood on CBS Television. Although he made an appearance, the actual performance was conducted by Robert Craft. Numerous films and videos of the composer have been preserved, including the 1966 award-winning National Film Board of Canada documentary Stravinsky, directed by Roman Kroitor and Wolf Koenig, in which he conducts the CBC Symphony Orchestra in a recording of the Symphony of Psalms.

Stravinsky published a number of books throughout his career, almost always with the aid of a (sometimes uncredited) collaborator. In his 1936 autobiography, Chronicle of My Life, which was written with the help of Walter Nouvel, Stravinsky included his well-known statement that "music is, by its very nature, essentially powerless to express anything at all." With Alexis Roland-Manuel and Pierre Souvtchinsky, he wrote his 1939–40 Harvard University Charles Eliot Norton Lectures, which were delivered in French and first collected under the title  in 1942 and then translated in 1947 as Poetics of Music. In 1959, several interviews between the composer and Robert Craft were published as Conversations with Igor Stravinsky, which was followed by a further five volumes over the following decade. A collection of Stravinsky's writings and interviews appears under the title Confidences sur la musique.

Selected writings
Books
 
 
  Reprinted Berkeley: University of California Press, 1980. .
 . Reprinted 1981, Berkeley and Los Angeles: University of California Press.  The 2002 reprinted "One-Volume Edition" varies from the 1960 original, London: Faber and Faber. .
  Originally published in French as Chroniques de ma vie, 2 vols. (Paris: Denoël et Steele, 1935), subsequently translated (anonymously) as Chronicle of My Life. London: Gollancz, 1936. . This edition reprinted as Igor Stravinsky – An Autobiography, with a preface by Eric Walter White (London: Calder and Boyars, 1975) . Reprinted again as An Autobiography (1903–1934) (London: Boyars, 1990) . Also published as Igor Stravinsky – An Autobiography (New York: M. & J. Steuer, 1958).
  Reprinted, Berkeley and Los Angeles: University of California Press, 1981.
  The 1968 reprinted Dialogues varies from the 1963 original, London: Faber and Faber. .
 
 
  A one-volume edition of Themes and Episodes (1966) and Retrospectives and Conclusions (1969) as revised by Igor Stravinsky in 1971. .

Articles
  At DICTECO
  At DICTECO
 
  At DICTECO
  At SCRIBD.
 
  At DICTECO
  At DICTECO
  Translated in English, 1936, as An Autobiography.

References

Notes

Citations

Sources 

 
 
 
 
 
 
 
 
 
 
 
 
 
 
 
 
 
 
 
 
 
 
 
 
 
 
 
 
 
 
 
 
 
 
 
 
 
 
 
 
 
 
 
 
 
 
 
 
 
 
 
 
 
 
 
 
 
 
 
 
 
 
 
 
 
 
 
 
 
 
 
 
 
 
 
 
 
 
 
 
 
 
 
 
 
 
 
 
 
 
 
 
 
 
 
 
 
 
  Excerpt, The New York Times. Retrieved 12 July 2021.

Further reading

External links

 
 The Stravinsky Foundation website
 
 
 " 'Jews and Geniuses': An Exchange" between Richard Taruskin and Robert Craft, The New York Review of Books, 15 June 1989, on Stravinsky being a Jew or not and about his anti-Semitism. See also another exchange between Niel Glixon and Craft, 27 April 1989; and the original review (16 February 1989) by Robert Craft of John Rockwell's article "Reactionary Musical Modernists" (9 September 1988) in The New York Times.

 
1882 births
1971 deaths
20th-century American composers
20th-century American conductors (music)
20th-century American male musicians
20th-century American pianists
20th-century classical composers
20th-century classical pianists
Academic staff of the École Normale de Musique de Paris
American classical composers
American classical pianists
American male classical composers
American male classical pianists
American male conductors (music)
American opera composers
American people of Polish descent
American people of Russian descent
Ballets Russes composers
Burials at Isola di San Michele
Composers for piano
Grammy Award winners
Grammy Lifetime Achievement Award winners
Honorary Members of the Royal Philharmonic Society
Emigrants from the Russian Empire to France
Emigrants from the Russian Empire to Switzerland
Emigrants from the Russian Empire to the United States
Jazz-influenced classical composers
Male opera composers
Modernist composers
Naturalized citizens of France
Neoclassical composers
People from Lomonosov
People from Petergofsky Uyezd
Pupils of Nikolai Rimsky-Korsakov
Ragtime composers
Recipients of the Léonie Sonning Music Prize
Royal Philharmonic Society Gold Medallists
Russian anti-communists
Russian classical pianists
Russian conductors (music)
Russian male conductors (music)
Russian male classical composers
Russian opera composers
Russian Orthodox Christians from the United States
Russian people of Polish descent
Twelve-tone and serial composers